Pidhaitsi (Pidhajci) is a small city in Ternopil Raion, Ternopil Oblast (province) of western Ukraine. It is located ca. 15.5 mi south of Berezhany, 43.5 mi from Ternopil and ca. 62 mi south-east of Lviv. In 1939 Pidhaitsi obtained the formal status of a city. It hosts the administration of Pidhaitsi urban hromada, one of the hromadas of Ukraine. Population: 

Many of the current residents have the surname Koropetskyi/Koropetska, likely attributable to city's proximity to the Koropets River.

History 

According to the sources, Pidhaitsi is one of the oldest settlements in the area. It was established in 1445. The first written records of the town date to 1436, when a Catholic church was built by the regional governor, a member of the Potocki noble family. In 1698, the Battle of Podhajce took place near the town. Because of the Tatar invasions and its precarious location on Poland’s main route to the south, the city was surrounded by series of ramparts and rows with water. Most of the key monuments (churches, synagogue) were all built in impressive defensive style. In its early years, the town was governed according to Ruthenian and Polish law. In 1539 it was granted the right to use Magdeburg law. Here was fought the Battle of Podhajce (1667).

In modern period, Pidhaitsi was among the most important urban centers in western part of Podolia. Its population was almost entirely Jews and Poles. In 1897 an obelisk was erected adjacent to the (Polish) Catholic church to celebrate the 100th birthday of Polish writer Adam Mickiewicz. While the monument is still extant, the church is in desolate condition. In one of Pidhaitsi houses resided famous Polish composer Frédéric Chopin. After the Second World War, Pidhaitsi, along with most of eastern Galicia, was separated from Poland and annexed to the Ukrainian Soviet Socialist Republic in the Soviet Union. Since that time, the population has been almost entirely ethnically Ukrainian.

During Soviet rule (1945–1991) Pidhaitsi was part of Berezhany Raion. After Ukrainian independence, a separated Pidhaitsi Raion was established. 
Until 18 July 2020, Pidhaitsi was the administrative center of Pidhaitsi Raion. The raion was abolished in July 2020 as part of the administrative reform of Ukraine, which reduced the number of raions of Ternopil Oblast to three. The area of Pidhaitsi Raion was merged into Ternopil Raion.

Jewish community 
Prior to the Second World War, Pidhaitsi had a significant Jewish community. The population census of 1765 lists 1,370 Jews in the kahal district of Pidhaitsi and 1,079 Jews lived in Pidhaitsi itself. A century late town’s Jewish population significantly increased and numbered ca. 6,000 Jews in Pidhaitsi and 8,212 Jews in Pidhaitsi district (9.33% of whole population in the area). In the 20th century Pidahytsi's importance declined and the number of the Jews decreased to 2,827 according to the census of 1931. Pidhaitsi Synagogue (between 1621 and 1648), and the local Catholic parish church (1634) are the oldest buildings in the city. The synagogue is closed and in ruined condition. In the post war years, the synagogue territory was turned into a market by the communists.

With the break of the Second World War there was a large influx of Jewish refugees from the west and the number of the Jews in the town at the time of Nazi annihilation was higher than 3,000. Pidhaitsi Judenrat was headed by Leibish Lilienfeld. Due to the refugee and hygienic problems, in the winter of 1941–42 many of town Jews died of hunger and typhus epidemic. In 1942, on September 21 (Yom Kippur – Jewish most revered holiday, the day of atonement from sin) over 1,000 Jews were sent to the Belzec extermination camp and on October 30, 1,500 more Jews were deported to face death in Belzec extermination camp.  Hundreds more were murdered in Pidhaitsi and its environs by Germans and Ukrainian police.

The above memories of his experiences during the liquidation of the ghetto in Pidhaitsi has described by Genia Schwartz.

Population

Notable natives
 Julian Bilecki, Righteous Among the Nations
 Ignacy Potocki, Polish count
 Tadeusz Łomnicki, Polish actor
 Jan Łomnicki, Polish film director and screenwriter
 Stanisław Rewera Potocki, Polish magnate and military leader
 Jerzy Choróbski, Polish neurosurgeon
 Leonard Rettel, Polish poet and writer
 Mikołaj Wolski, Polish military leader
 Arthur Murray, American dancer
 Abraham Weiss, professor of Talmud

Gallery

See also
 Podhajcer Shul, New York City

References

External links

 Website about Pidhaitsi
 Photos of Pidhaitsi (70 digital images from 2004)
 Nature at Pidhaytsi — Photos
 Pidhaitsi Jewish history
 American Jewish couple visits Pidhaitsi (2001)
 Pidhaytsi Jewish history — article in word
 Pidhaitsi info, history and photos

Cities in Ternopil Oblast
Kingdom of Galicia and Lodomeria
Tarnopol Voivodeship
Shtetls
Towns of district significance in Ukraine
Holocaust locations in Ukraine